is a railway station located in the city of Hashima, Gifu Prefecture, Japan, operated by the private railway operator Meitetsu.  It is located in front of Gifu-Hashima Station on the Tōkaidō Shinkansen and allows passengers to go from the high speed train network to the Nagoya Railroad (Meitetsu) network and vice versa, but in practice most passengers to or from Gifu choose to enter or leave the high speed train network at Nagoya Station.

Lines

Station layout
Shin Hashima Station has one ground-level side platform serving a single bi-directional track. The station is unattended.

Platforms

Adjacent stations

History
Shin Hashima Station opened on 12 December 1982.

Surrounding area
Gifu College of Nursing

See also
 List of Railway Stations in Japan

External links

References

Railway stations in Japan opened in 1982
Stations of Nagoya Railroad
Railway stations in Gifu Prefecture
Hashima, Gifu